Severiano Álvarez (1933 – September 23, 2013) was a Leonese language writer. He was born in Cuevas del Sil (in the municipality of Palacios del Sil), province of León. He had two mentions in Leonese language in their region variety in 1982 and 1983, and was awarded with two more in 1983. He died on September 23, 2013, aged 80.

Books 

 Cousas de Aiquí (1987)

Collective books 

 Cuentos del Sil (2006)
 El Dialecto Leonés (2006)

See also 

 List of Leonese language writers
 Leonese language
 Cuentos del Sil
 Kingdom of León

References 

1933 births
2013 deaths
People from El Bierzo
Leonese-language writers